David John Young (born 11 December 1977) is a former English cricketer and a sport psychologist.  Young was a right-handed batsman.  He was born in Coventry, Warwickshire.

Young studied at Durham University, where he appeared for the university team. He later represented the Middlesex Cricket Board in 2 List A matches against the Derbyshire Cricket Board and Cambridgeshire in the 1st and 2nd rounds of the 2003 Cheltenham & Gloucester Trophy which were held in 2002.  In his 2 List A matches, he scored 32 runs at a batting average of 16.00, with a high score of 22.

Young is a sport psychologist, working with a number of professional teams across a variety of sports

References

External links
David Young at Cricinfo
David Young at CricketArchive

1977 births
Living people
Cricketers from Coventry
People from Warwickshire
English cricketers
Middlesex Cricket Board cricketers
Alumni of Durham University